Obafemi Lasode  (born 4 December 1955) is a Nigerian veteran musician, film director and producer, songwriter, music producer, and playwright. He is the chief executive officer of Even-Ezra Nigeria Limited, the stable that produced an award-winning movie titled Sango in 1997.

Early life 
Obafemi Bandele Lasode was born on 4 December 1955 in Port Harcourt, the capital of Rivers State, Nigeria but hails from Abeokuta, a city in Ogun State southwestern Nigeria.

He attended St. Gregory's College at Obalende in Lagos State, where he obtained the West African Senior School Certificate. He later obtained a Bachelor of Science degree in Business administration from Kogod School of Business, Washington, D.C. Thereafter, he obtained a Master of Science degree in Communication art from Brooklyn College, City University of New York.

Career 
He joined the services of Inner City Broadcasting Corporation, New York City, in 1983 as a Promotions Coordinator, where he hosted Sonny Okosuns in 1984 at the world-famous Apollo Theater in Harlem.

He produced the African music programme Afrika in Vogue on Radio Nigeria 2, which ran from the first quarter of 1989 for a year. In 1995, he established Afrika 'n Vogue/Even-Ezra Studios.

In 1997, he produced and directed an award-winning African epic titled Sango, a film that was selected to open the Minneapolis–Saint Paul International Film Festival in 2002. He authored a book titled Television Broadcasting: The Nigerian Experience (1959–1992), currently in use in Nigerian universities.

Filmography 
Sango (1997)
Mask of Mulumba (1998)
Lishabi
Tears of Slavery

See also
 List of Nigerian film producers

References 

Living people
1955 births
Nigerian male film actors
Yoruba male actors
Film directors from Port Harcourt
Nigerian film producers
Male actors from Port Harcourt
Brooklyn College alumni
Yoruba filmmakers
St Gregory's College, Lagos alumni
Nigerian expatriates in the United States
Kogod School of Business alumni
Nigerian chief executives
Nigerian male musicians
People from Ogun State
Nigerian television producers
Nigerian film directors
Nigerian songwriters
Nigerian dramatists and playwrights
Nigerian businesspeople